Nikolaos Georgalis (born July 23, 1957), commonly known as either Nikos Galis, or Nick Galis, is a retired Greek professional basketball player. Galis, who during his playing days was nicknamed, "Nick The Greek", "The Gangster", and "The Iron Man", is widely regarded as Europe's greatest scorer to ever play the game, and as one of the all-time greatest players in FIBA international basketball history. In 1991, Galis was named one of FIBA's 50 Greatest Players. In 2007, he became an inaugural member of the FIBA Hall of Fame. In 2008, he was chosen as one of the 50 Greatest EuroLeague Contributors. In 2017, he was inducted into the Naismith Memorial Basketball Hall of Fame.

During his college basketball career at Seton Hall University, Galis played at the point guard position. However, his primary position during his pro career was shooting guard. He spent most of his club playing career with Aris Thessaloniki, before having a late career stint with Panathinaikos Athens. Among qualified players, he is the EuroLeague's all-time leader in points per game scoring average, when counting both the FIBA and EuroLeague Basketball eras (1958–present). He was also the league's top scorer of the season, numerous times. In Europe's premier basketball club competition, he reached the EuroLeague Final Four on four occasions, making it in three consecutive years with Aris (1988, 1989, 1990), and in another year with Panathinaikos (1994). Galis won eight Greek league championships, and he is also the Greek Championship's amateur era all-time leading scorer, in both career points scored and career scoring average, when counting all league formats prior to the league becoming fully professional, in the 1992–93 season.

Galis led the Greece men's national basketball team to the EuroBasket's gold medal in 1987, and he earned the tournament's MVP award in the process. Following his stunning success in winning the 1987 EuroBasket title, Galis won both the Mr. Europa and the Euroscar player of the year awards. He also led Greece to a silver medal at the 1989 EuroBasket, where he was also selected to the All-EuroBasket Team. Overall during his national team career, he was named to the All-EuroBasket Team four times (1983, 1987, 1989, 1991). Among his myriad of accomplishments, he holds the EuroBasket's record for the highest career scoring average (31.2 points per game), and he was also the leading scorer of four EuroBasket tournaments, in 1983, 1987, 1989, and 1991. Galis also owns two major records of the FIBA World Championship/Cup tournament. He holds the records for the highest career scoring average (33.5 points per game), and the most total points ever scored in a single tournament, which he set at the 1986 FIBA World Championship.

Galis, who was named the Greek Male Athlete of the Year three times (1986, 1987, 1989), is highly revered in Greece, where he is considered by many to be one of the greatest national athletes that the country has ever had. His years with Aris Thessaloniki and the Greece national team, lifted Greek basketball from a place of relative obscurity, to both European and global power status. Galis was the sports icon that eventually inspired thousands of Greeks to take up playing the game of basketball.

Early life and high school
Galis was born in Union City, New Jersey. The child of a poor immigrant family, from the Greek islands of Rhodes and Nisyros, Galis took up boxing in his early years, after his father, George Georgalis, who had also been a boxer in his youth. He was later persuaded to give up boxing by his mother, Stella Georgalis, who was terrified after each time that her son would return home from boxing training with a new facial injury. As a result, Galis started playing the sport of basketball instead of boxing. He attended Union Hill High School, in Union City, where he played high school basketball for legendary coach William J. McKeever , as well as American football.

College career
After high school, Galis enrolled at Seton Hall University, where he played college basketball as a member of the Seton Hall Pirates. In his senior 1978–79 season, Galis saw his scoring average reach 27.5 points per game, which was third in the nation, behind Idaho State's Lawrence Butler (30.1 points per game) and Indiana State's Larry Bird (28.6 points per game), including a 48-point outburst against the University of Santa Clara.

Also in his senior year of college, Galis won the Haggerty Award (the New York City metro area's best player award), and the Eastern College Athletic Conference Player of the Year award. The same year, he also played in the Pizza Hut All-American game, alongside Bird and Vinnie Johnson. During his four-year college career, Galis played in a total of 107 games and scored 1,651 points, for a career scoring average of 15.4 points per game.

Galis' head coach at Seton Hall, Bill Raftery, would later state that Galis was the best player that he ever coached. While at Seton Hall, Galis was a good friend and roommate of Italian-American professional basketball player Dan Callandrillo. Galis was later inducted into the Seton Hall Athletic Hall of Fame, in 1991.

College stats

Professional career

Boston Celtics
After finishing his collegiate career in 1979, Galis signed with agent Bill Manon, who also managed Diana Ross. Manon did not have Galis work out with any NBA team. Galis was eventually selected by the Boston Celtics in the 4th round of the 1979 NBA Draft, 68th overall. Due to a severe ankle injury that Galis suffered during the Celtics preseason training camp of the 1979–80 season, the franchise was no longer interested in offering him a contract because Gerald Henderson had taken his place on the team, and his injury would keep him out for the foreseeable future.

Galis then decided to pursue a professional career in Greece's top-tier level Basket League. Later, while still playing in Greece, he would be offered NBA contracts by the Celtics and the New Jersey Nets. However, he turned the offers down, because at the time, and until 1989, FIBA did not have professional status, and consequently did not allow NBA players to compete at the national team level. Since playing with the Greek men's national basketball team meant so much to him, he stayed in Greece. Celtics then-president Red Auerbach later said that the single biggest mistake he ever made in his career was not keeping Galis.

Aris Thessaloniki

After suffering an ankle injury in the Boston Celtics 1979–80 preseason training camp, which prevented him from receiving a contract with the Celtics, Galis made the move across the Atlantic, and signed to play with Aris Thessaloniki of Greece, in 1979. The two major Greek clubs of Panathinaikos Athens and Olympiacos Piraeus, had also shown some interest in signing him, but it was Aris Thessaloniki's interest that was the most persuasive to Galis. His move to the country would eventually help Greek club basketball to reach a level of popularity that had never been previously imagined.

Galis was the indisputable leader of Aris Thessaloniki, as he averaged more than 30 points per game in nearly every season and competition that he played in with the team. With Aris Thessaloniki, he played alongside other great European players like Panagiotis Giannakis and Slobodan Subotić, who was known in Greece as Lefteris Soumpotits. With Aris Thessaloniki, Galis won eight Greek League championships, in the years 1983, 1985, 1986, 1987, 1988, 1989, 1990, and 1991. He won seven out of his eight Greek League championships in consecutive years, with three of those championships being won in undefeated seasons. He also won six Greek Cup titles with Aris Thessaloniki, in the years 1985, 1987, 1988, 1989, 1990, and 1992. Four of his six Greek Cup titles were won in consecutive years.

In the top-level European-wide club competition, the FIBA European Champions' Cup (EuroLeague), Galis led Aris Thessaloniki to three consecutive appearances at the competition's Final Four. Galis' team played at the 1988 Ghent Final Four, the 1989 Munich Final Four, and the 1990 Zaragoza Final Four. In the one major disappointment of an otherwise glittering club career with Aris Thessaloniki, all three of Galis' FIBA European Champions' Cup Final Four appearances ended in losses in the semifinals. Which thus deprived him of the opportunity to shine all the way onto Europe's biggest club stage, at the FIBA European Champions' Cup Finals (EuroLeague Finals). However, the team's performances and general standard of play, won over the hearts of most basketball fans in Greece. In fact, cinemas and theaters in Greece would often reduce their ticket admission prices on Thursday evenings, when Aris Thessaloniki was playing games, as large segments of the country settled down to watch them on television.

In June 1991, Galis was chosen as a member of The Balkans Selection All-Star Team that played against The European Selection All-Star Team at the 1991 FIBA Centennial Jubilee. The 1991 FIBA Jubilee event was held in order to commemorate the 100th anniversary of the creation of the sport of basketball in 1891, by the Canadian James Naismith. The FIBA Jubilee All-Star Game took place at the Peace and Friendship Stadium, in Piraeus, Athens, Greece, and it included numerous legends of European basketball. The Balkans' All-Star Selection won the game, by a score of 103–102. Galis was the game's top scorer, with 20 points.

On 19 December 1991, in one of his final FIBA EuroLeague games with Aris Thessaloniki, Galis rolled back the clock. At the age of 34, he scored 46 points, on 13/20 field goals overall, 8/14 2-point field goals, 5/6 3-point field goals, and 15/18 free throws, in a 111–108 loss against the Italian League club Olimpia Milano. However, Aris Thessaloniki's 1991–92 FIBA EuroLeague season was a disappointment, as the club finished group stage play with a record of 3–11.

Also in that same 1991–92 season, in a Greek League game against Panionios Athens, Galis scored 48 points, on 17/21 field goals overall, 15/18 2-point field goals, 2/3 3-point field goals, and 12/13 free throws. However, Aris Thessaloniki failed to make it to the 1992 Greek League's Finals. It was the first time that the team had not won the Greek League championship, since 1984.

Eventually, the 1991–92 season ended up being Galis' final campaign with Aris Thessaloniki. At that time, the team was under new management and was trying to bring down the club's debts. That combined with Galis' huge salary for that time, and the fact that the team was in a period of decline, were the main causes for his departure. Galis, who adored the city of Thessaloniki and Aris' fans, had originally insisted on remaining in the club and playing for the team, as he believed that he still had a lot to offer the club. Ultimately however, Galis was forced to leave the club. In his last game for the club, Galis scored 18 points (6/9, 6/9, 0/2) as Aris beat AEK 74–62 to win yet another Greek Cup title in 1992.

Panathinaikos Athens
Galis moved to Athens, in the summer of 1992, to play with Panathinaikos. He was the player who then led the "Greens" to a club rebirth, after it had suffered through a long drought period, during which the historical team had remained without winning any titles. The previous season (1991–92) had been particularly disappointing for the club, with the team finishing in eighth place in the Greek league. As the team's captain, Galis inspired the young players of Panathinaikos Athens, such as Fragiskos Alvertis and Nikos Oikonomou, and he gradually brought back hope to the team's fans. So much so, as to the point that the club's then home arena, Glyfada Indoor Hall, was always overcrowded. In that season (1992–93), Panathinaikos Athens finished in second place in the Greek league, and also won the Greek Cup title, which was the seventh Greek Cup title for Galis.

In the following 1993–94 season, Galis was the FIBA European League (EuroLeague)'s Top Scorer, with an average of 23.8 points per game, in 21 games played. He also led the league in assists, with an average of 4.7 assists per game. In Panathinaikos Athens' decisive Game 3 victory of the FIBA European League's quarterfinals, against the then reigning league champions, the French League club Limoges, Galis truly led Panathinaikos Athens into a new club era. Galis led Panathinaikos Athens' qualification to the 1994 Tel Aviv FIBA European League Final Four, by scoring 30 points in the deciding playoff game, on 12–16 (75%) field goal shooting in the game. The "Greens" eventually finished in third place in the FIBA European League that season, after they lost in the semifinals to their arch-rivals Olympiacos Piraeus, by a score of 77–72.

However, it was still the furthest that the club had reached in the competition since the 1971–72 season. Galis scored 30 points in Panathinaikos Athens' win in the Final Four's third place game against the Spanish League club FC Barcelona, as he led all scorers in the game, with 30 points. Galis was named to the All-Final Four Team.

In what proved to be one of his final games for Panathinaikos, during the 3rd/4th place playoff series against Panionios in May 1994, Galis went scoreless in a game for the first time in his professional career in Greece, ending game 2 (which Panathinaikos lost 93–71) with 0/4 two-point shots from 29 minutes' play. Galis rallied to score 18 and 22 points in games 3 and 4, both of which Panathinaikos won to seal 3rd spot and a place in the FIBA European League for the following season.

In his third season with Panthinaikos Athens (1994–95), Galis teamed up with Panagiotis Giannakis and Žarko Paspalj, to make a strong effort to win the championship of the FIBA European League. Galis was the player who led Panathinaikos Athens to the competition's Top 16 group stage, as he prevented their elimination from the competition against the Ukrainian Super League club Budivelnyk Kyiv, with a game-high of 23 points in the club's decisive second-leg game victory. Galis was also the leader of the team in their Greek Cup win against Olympiacos Piraeus, at the Sporting Sports Arena.

At the age of 37, Galis played in his last game in professional basketball, as a player of Panathinaikos Athens, on October 12, 1994. It was in a game against Dafni Athens, in Week 1 of the Greek League's 1994–95 season. In that game, Galis scored a total of 8 points (2/2, 3/3), in 35 minutes of playing time. Panathinaikos Athens won the game in a blowout, by a score of 82–60.

Galis' playing career then ended controversially, on October 18, 1994, before Panathinaikos Athens' Week 2 game of the Greek League's 1994–95 season. Kostas Politis, who was the head coach of Panathinaikos Athens at the time, decided not to include Galis in the team's starting line-up of that Greek League game versus Ampelokipoi Athens. In protest against the head coach's decision, Galis left the arena, and ultimately, he never returned to playing action again. His retirement was officially announced in the media, on September 29, 1995.

During his pro club basketball career, Galis scored a total of 12,864 points, in 384 Greek Basket League games played, for a career scoring average of 33.5 points per game. In the 55 career Greek Cup games in which he played, he scored a total of 1,935 points, for a career scoring average of 35.2 points per game. He also averaged 42.5 points per game, in the two Greek Super Cup games that he played in. He scored a total of 864 points, in 23 FIBA Korać Cup games, for a career scoring average of 37.6 points per game. In the FIBA EuroLeague, he scored a total of 4,047 points, in 125 games played, for a career scoring average of 32.4 points per game. Overall, in all of the pro club competitions that he played in, Galis scored a total of 19,795 points, in 589 games played, for a pro club career scoring average of 33.6 points per game.

Career pro club statistics

Greek League season by season scoring stats
(Regular season and postseason)

Season by season scoring stats in European-wide leagues

National team career
Galis first played with the Greece men's national basketball team at the 1980 FIBA European Olympic Qualifying Tournament. He averaged 20.5 points per game at the tournament. His tournament single-game scoring high was 30 points, which came in a game against Switzerland. However, Greece failed to qualify for the 1980 Moscow Summer Olympic Games. At the 1981 EuroBasket, Galis averaged 19.9 points per game. Greece finished the tournament in 9th place. At the 1983 EuroBasket, Galis averaged 33.6 points per game, and he was the tournament's leading scorer. Greece finished the tournament in 11th place.

On 20 November 1983, Galis played in a friendly game against the North Carolina Tar Heels, at The Demetria Tournament '83. The game took place at the Alexandreio Melathron arena. During that game, Galis, who was Greece's shooting guard, was guarded by North Carolina's shooting guard, Michael Jordan. Galis scored 24 points during the game.

At the 1984 FIBA European Olympic Qualifying Tournament, Galis averaged 31.6 points per game, and he was the tournament's leading scorer. His tournament single-game scoring high was 45 points, which came in a game against Great Britain. However, Greece failed to qualify for the 1984 Los Angeles Summer Olympic Games.

With Greece, Galis won the bronze medal at the 1984 Balkan Championship. At the 1986 FIBA World Championship, Galis led the tournament in scoring, as he averaged 33.7 points per game. During the tournament, he had a 53-point outburst in a game against Panama. Greece finished the tournament in 10th place. With Greece, Galis won the gold medal at the 1986 Balkan Championship.

Galis next led the Greece national team to the 1987 EuroBasket gold medal. Galis led the tournament in scoring, as he averaged 37.0 points per game. He scored 40 points in the tournament's finals against the Soviet Union national team and its legendary player, Šarūnas Marčiulionis, as he led Greece to a 103–101 victory. He was named the MVP of the tournament.

At the 1988 FIBA European Olympic Qualifying Tournament, Galis averaged 28.4 points per game, and he was the tournament's leading scorer. His tournament single-game scoring high was 35 points, which came in a game against Germany. However, Greece failed to qualify for the 1988 Seoul Summer Olympic Games.

Galis also led Greece to the silver medal at the 1989 EuroBasket, which he led in scoring, with an average of 35.6 points per game. Galis is most remembered from that tournament, for a stunning effort against the Soviet team led by Marčiulionis, and its other star player, Arvydas Sabonis, in their semifinals game. Galis scored 45 out of his team's 81 total points, in a dramatic last-gasp 81–80 victory. The Greek team then settled for a second-place finish, after they lost against the dominant Yugoslav national team, in the tournament's finals.

Galis also represented Greece at the 1991 FIBA Centennial Jubilee, which commemorated the 100th anniversary of the creation of the sport of basketball, by the Canadian James Naismith. The Jubilee tournament took place at the Peace and Friendship Stadium, in Piraeus, Athens, Greece. In three games played during the tournament, Galis averaged 21.0 points per game.

At the 1991 EuroBasket, Galis averaged 32.4 points per game, and he also led the tournament in scoring. In total, Galis was the leading scorer of the EuroBasket four times. He was also a four-time All-EuroBasket Team member.

In total, Galis played in 168 FIBA-recognized games with the Greece national team, in which he scored a total of 5,129 points, for a career scoring average of 30.5 points per game. Galis is in the second place, on the list of the all-time career scoring leaders in the history of Greece's senior national team. Panagiotis Giannakis is in first place on the list.

Greek senior national team career statistics

Greece National Team scoring stats by tournament

Galis' top 10 scoring FIBA games

Highest scoring single games by competition

Player profile 
Galis was not only a legendary scorer, he was also a great play maker and passer. The majority of his points scored came inside the paint area, due to his penetrating ability. Galis' mid-range jumper was one of his biggest offensive weapons, as he was able to consistently make it against defensive pressure. Galis' great strength and leaping ability allowed him to have an excellent post game against other guards, despite his short stature, as compared to most other players. Another enormous competitive advantage that Galis possessed was his incredible stamina, which was due to his exemplary physical conditioning. At the 1987 EuroBasket, after the first game of the competition, Galis was never substituted out of any of the tournament's remaining games. His stamina and conditioning led to him being given the nickname of "The Iron Man".

Post-playing career and personal life
Galis is married to Eleni Panagiotou, and he has one daughter, named Stella. Since his official retirement from playing professional club basketball on September 29, 1995, and up until early 2006, Galis was the owner of a summer basketball camp in Chalkidiki, Greece. The basketball camp was listed at the Athens Stock Exchange. As a token of appreciation for his contribution to Greek sport, Galis was chosen to be the first torch bearer, in the final round of the Olympic Flame, for the Athens 2004 Summer Olympics. Galis entered the stadium at the conclusion of the Opening Ceremony, and set off the procession of the flame to the altar.

In September 2007, Galis was inducted as a member of the first class of the FIBA Hall of Fame, which includes the best basketball players in the history of the game internationally. Galis was inducted as a player. Bill Russell, of the famous Boston Celtics dynasty, was another one of the 16 inaugural player inductees. Galis was also entered into the Eurobasket.com website's European Basketball Hall of Fame, inducted as a player.

In May 2013, his former club team Aris Thessaloniki, renamed the court of their home arena, the Alexandreio Melathron, to "Nick Galis Hall". The club also organized a celebration of Galis' life and career, and retired his number 6 Aris jersey. The event was attended by many of his former teammates and opponents, from the 1980s and 1990s. Some of the attendees included the majority of the Greece men's national basketball team's 1987 EuroBasket gold medal-winning team, as well as numerous other international basketball stars who played against Galis over the years, such as Dino Rađja, Jordi Villacampa, and Doron Jamchi, among others.

On April 1, 2017, it was announced that Galis would be inducted into the Naismith Memorial Basketball Hall of Fame, as part of the 2017 Hall of Fame class. Galis was later inducted into the Naismith Memorial Basketball Hall of Fame, on September 9, 2017. He became one of the very few men's basketball players from around the world, to be inducted into the Basketball Hall of Fame, without having ever played in the NBA. On June 14, 2016, exactly 29 years after Greece's national team won the gold medal at the 1987 EuroBasket, the court of the biggest basketball arena in Greece, the OAKA Olympic Indoor Hall, was named the "Nikos Galis Olympic Indoor Hall", in his honour.

Quotes about Galis 

"I never thought that there was such a good offensive player in Europe, and especially in Greece.", Michael Jordan

"I've seen Galis do things, that I've seen neither Lakers nor Celtics do.", Bob McAdoo

"I admire him. When he plays one on one, there's no way to stop him. I didn't think that there would ever be a player, who by himself, could cause nightmares and even beat the Soviet Union.", Sergei Belov

"If Galis wants to score, he will score no matter who's defending him.", Arvydas Sabonis

"If I'm The Son of the Devil, then Galis is The Devil himself.", Dražen Petrović

"I’d like to be on the same team with him, so I could pass to him, and then watch him score a basket.”, Dražen Petrović"Although Drazen (i.e. Petrović) is my brother, for the best athlete of 1987, I voted for Galis.", Aco Petrović

"Galis is a great player. He is one of the best European players. He was a really tough opponent, he floated in the air, he was one of the best.", Dino Radja

"Petrović and Galis were the most charismatic players I've ever known. "Galis is the only player who made me shudder.", Doron Jamchi

"Everyone who plays basketball, owes Galis money.", Fanis Christodoulou

"If we played together, we would have scored 300 points in every game!", Vassilis Goumas

"The man is a computer! If he had played with us in AEK in the '60s, we would have been undefeated.", Georgios Amerikanos

"A European and Greek basketball changed. It is my honor to play with him. He is the greatest of all time "., Sasha Volkov

"I've seen many players in my career, but what Galis does on the floor, only 2–3 in the world can do.", Audie Norris

"Who wouldn't want to play with Galis? I would definitely give the ball to Galis on the last play. Galis changed basketball in Greece and Europe.", Audie Norris

"Galis wasn't affected by anything. I count him among the five best players of Europe.", Georgios Sigalas

"In Greece, Galis is what Michael Jordan is in America.", Steve Giatzoglou

"Galis is the player of the 21st century.", Alexander Gomelsky, USSR head coach.

"I had nightmares of Galis all night.", Pierre Dao, Limoges head coach.

"I had given specific instructions on how to defend against the other 4 players. As for Nikos, we just had to sit down and pray!", Wojciech Krajewski, Lech Poznan head coach.

"There is only one way I can think of to stop Nikos from scoring. Lock him up in his hotel room, so that he can't come to the arena.", Ruud Harrewijn, Dutch national team head coach.

Awards and accomplishments 

Galis won numerous titles and awards during his career and had many memorable single game performances. The following are some of them:

College
 Haggerty Award (New York Metro Area Player of the Year): 1979
 ECAC Player of the Year: 1979
 Member of the Seton Hall Athletic Hall of Fame: 1991

Pro career
Titles:
 8× Greek League Champion: 1983, 1985, 1986, 1987, 1988, 1989, 1990, 1991
 7× Greek Cup Winner: 1985, 1987, 1988, 1989, 1990, 1992, 1993
 Greek Super Cup Winner: 1986(In total, he won 16 trophies in his pro club career as a player.)

Personal awards and achievements:
 11× Greek League Top Scorer: 1981, 1982, 1983, 1984, 1985, 1986, 1987, 1988, 1989, 1990, 1991
 Greek Super Cup Finals Top Scorer: 1986
 3× Greek Male Athlete of the Year: 1986, 1987, 1989
 5× Greek Cup Finals Top Scorer: 1987, 1989, 1990, 1992, 1993
 5× Greek League Finals MVP: 1987, 1988, 1989, 1990, 1991
 2× FIBA European Selection: 1987, 1991 I
 Mediterranean Player of the Year: 1987
 Euroscar European Player of the Year: 1987
 Mr. Europa European Player of the Year: 1987
 L'Équipe Champion of Champions' 10th Best Athlete in the World: 1987
 5× FIBA EuroLeague Top Scorer: 1988, 1989, 1990, 1992, 1994
 5× Greek League MVP: 1988, 1989, 1990, 1991, 1992
 4× Greek League Assist Leader: 1991, 1992, 1993, 1994
 2× Greek League All-Star (1991, 1994 I)
 FIBA EuroLeague Assists Leader: 1994
 FIBA EuroLeague All-Final Four Team: (1994) 
 EuroLeague Final Four all-time career scoring leader: 231 points (28.9 points per game).
 Greek Championship (amateur era) all-time career scoring leader: 12,864 points (33.5 points per game) – Vassilis Spanoulis is the league's professional era all-time career scoring leader.
 Greek Cup all-time career scoring leader: 1,935 points (35.2 points per game).
 FIBA's 50 Greatest Players: 1991
 Member of the FIBA Hall of Fame: 2007
 50 Greatest EuroLeague Contributors: 2008
 No. 6 jersey retired by Aris: 2013
 Member of the Naismith Memorial Basketball Hall of Fame: 2017
 101 Greats of European Basketball: 2018
 HoopsHype's 75 Greatest International Players Ever: 2021
 Greek Basket League Hall of Fame: 2022
 Along with Panagiotis Giannakis, he led Aris Thessaloniki to an 80-game winning streak in the Greek League, in the 1980s.
 His personal career single-game scoring high in a Greek League game was 62 points, which was achieved in a game on 24 January 1981, during the 1980–81 season (Aris Thessaloniki vs. Ionikos Nikaias). However, in the same game, Ionikos' superstar, Panagiotis Giannakis, who would later go on to become Galis' teammate on Aris, scored 73 points.
 His personal career single-game scoring high in the Greek Cup tournament was 52 points against Panellinios Athens, in the 1987 Greek Cup Final (15 April 1987).
 His personal career single-game scoring high in a European-wide continental club competition was 56 points against Vasas (5 November 1980), during the 1980–81 season of the FIBA Korać Cup.
 His personal career single-game scoring high in the FIBA European Champions' Cup (now called the EuroLeague), was 52 points, which he achieved twice. He scored 52 points versus Oostende in 1986–87 (2 October 1986). He also scored 52 points versus Lech Poznań in 1989–90 (7 December 1989).
 In 1993, while playing in the Greek League with Panathinaikos Athens, in a revenge game against his former team Aris Thessaloniki, he had a game for the ages. In the game, Galis made all 13 of his field goal attempts.
 4,047 points scored in 125 FIBA EuroLeague games played (32.4 points per game), and 864 points scored in 23 FIBA Korać Cup games played (37.6 points per game).

Greece National Team
 1983 EuroBasket: All-Tournament Team
 1984 Balkan Championship: 
 1986 FIBA World Championship: Top Scorer (33.7 points per game)
 1986 Balkan Championship: 
 1987 EuroBasket: 
 1989 EuroBasket: 
 1987 EuroBasket: Most Valuable Player
 4× FIBA EuroBasket All-Tournament Team: 1983, 1987, 1989, 1991 
 4× FIBA EuroBasket Top Scorer: 1983 (33.6 points per game), 1987 (37.0 points per game), 1989 (35.6 points per game), 1991 (32.4 points per game)
 2× FIBA European Olympic Qualification Top Scorer: 1984 (31.6 points per game), 1988 (28.4 points per game)
 At the 1986 FIBA World Championship, he scored 53 points in a game against Panama.
 In the 1987 EuroBasket Finals, he scored 40 points against the Soviet Union.
 In the 1989 EuroBasket Semifinals, he scored 45 points against the Soviet Union.
 In 168 FIBA-recognized games played with the Greece men's national basketball team, he averaged 30.5 points per game.
 Greece men's national basketball team's 2nd all-time career scoring leader (behind Panagiotis Giannakis): 5,167 total points scored, in 169 total games played (30.6 points per game). However, only 5,129 points in 168 games (30.5 points per game), is officially recognized.
 Galis was the top scorer in every major European and world international competition that he participated in from 1983 onward: the 1983 EuroBasket, the 1984 FIBA European Olympic Qualification, the 1986 FIBA World Championship, the 1987 EuroBasket, the 1988 FIBA European Olympic Qualification, the 1989 EuroBasket, and the 1991 EuroBasket.

See also
 Basketball in the United States
 FIBA Europe

Sources 
 Nikos Galis FIBA Archive official website.
 Nikos Galis FIBA Europe official website.
 Nikos Galis Hellenic Basketball Federation official website .
 Eurobasket.com's HALL OF FAME.
 
 BASKET ARIS – Unofficial fan site dedicated to ARIS B.C.

Notes

References

External links 

Twitter Account 
NBA Draft Profile
Nikos Galis FIBA Hall of Fame Profile
Euroleague.net 50 Greatest Contributors
FIBA Profile
Galis FIBA Europe Profile
Hellenic Basketball Federation Profile 
Interbasket.net Galis Profile
FIBAEurope.com Galis Story
Euroleague.net A scoring machine
101 Greats: Nikos Galis
Τα “κανόνια” του ελληνικού Πρωταθλήματος: Νίκος Γκάλης 
Nick Galis Unofficial Website
GrHomeBoy.com Galis Inducted into FIBA Hall of Fame
Books.Google.com Seton Hall Pirates Nick Galis
SHUPPirates.com Seton Hall – Galis

1957 births
Living people
1986 FIBA World Championship players
American men's basketball players
American people of Greek descent
Aris B.C. players
Basketball players from New Jersey
Boston Celtics draft picks
Euroscar award winners
FIBA EuroBasket-winning players
FIBA Hall of Fame inductees
Greek Basket League players
Greek businesspeople
Greek men's basketball players
Naismith Memorial Basketball Hall of Fame inductees
Panathinaikos B.C. players
Point guards
Seton Hall Pirates men's basketball players
Shooting guards
Sportspeople from Union City, New Jersey
Union Hill High School alumni